Peloza v. Capistrano Unified School District, 37 F.3d 517 (9th Cir. 1994), was a 1994 court case heard by United States Court of Appeals for the Ninth Circuit in which a creationist schoolteacher, John E. Peloza claimed that Establishment clause of the United States Constitution along with his own right to free speech was violated by the requirement to teach the "religion" of "evolutionism".  The court found against Peloza, finding that evolution was science not religion and that the Capistrano Unified School District school board were right to restrict his teaching of creationism in light of the 1987 Supreme Court decision Edwards v. Aguillard. One of the three appeals judges, Poole, partially dissented from the majority's free speech and due process opinions. It was one in a long line court cases involving the teaching of creationism which have found against creationists.  Peloza appealed to the Supreme Court, which declined to hear the case.

References 

Establishment Clause case law
United States education case law
United States Free Speech Clause case law
United States Court of Appeals for the Ninth Circuit cases
United States creationism and evolution case law
1994 in United States case law
1994 in religion
1994 in education
Education in Orange County, California
Mission Viejo, California